Jungal Balahu was a Tiwa king in mediaeval Northeast India around 1365-1385. The kingdom was in present-day Raha, Assam ruled Tiwa people (India).  A statue of Jungal Balahu is erected in Jungal Balahu Garh. It is a tourist destination,

Early life 
Balahu, also known as Mriganka in 1415-1440, was son of Gangawati and Arimatta(Sasaknka) in 1365-1385 Kamata Kingdom. During Baro-Bhuyan's rule was the son of Chandraprabha/Khonchari and Pratap Singha/Mayamatta.This is described in Deo Langkhui. Pratap Singha/Pratap Dhwaja in 1305-1325 was the ruler of Kamata Kingdom He established his kingdom at Sahari near Raha, Assam.

Last Kamata Kingdom ruler 
Balahu died of drowning in Kallong river where he was taking a bath. His wife Xukomola was daughter of Naga king Fa Badchah. She conspired with her father and hid the divine sword of Balahu that made him invincible.He defeated all nearby kingdoms. Mriganka/ Balahu was the last ruler of Kamata Kingdom. After him Niladhwaj of Kamata came to power established Khen dynasty, thereby ending the  Kamata Kingdom.

References

Notes 

 Narasimha and Emenyouin : African Literature Comes of Age, 1988,p 1-3
 Richard M Dorson : Folklore and Folklife,1972,p-2
 Padmanath Gohain Barua : Assam Buranji Buranji
 Pratap Chandra Choudhury: History of Civilization of the people of Assam to the 12th century AD,p26
 Dharma Singh Deka : Rahar Regoni, Jyotirekha Nagaon,1980
 Maneswar Dewri : Tiwa Janajati aru Bhasar Itihas, Tribal Research Institute, Guwahati, Assam,1991

Tourism in Assam
Tribes of Assam
Ahom kingdom
Assam